The Perales River is a tributary of the Alberche River in Spain.

See also 
 List of rivers of Spain

References

Rivers of Spain
Tributaries of the Alberche